The British Virgin Islands men's national softball team is the national team for the British Virgin Islands. The 1988 World Championships were held in Saskatoon, Canada. The team played 13 games in the round robin round, finishing twelfth overall.

References

Men's national softball teams
National sports teams of the British Virgin Islands
Men's sport in the British Virgin Islands
Softball in the British Virgin Islands